The 1974 Louisville Cardinals football team represented the University of Louisville in the 1974 NCAA Division I football season. The team played their home games in Cardinal Stadium and was led by T. W. Alley in his second and final year as head coach.

Schedule

Team players in the NFL Draft

References

Louisville
Louisville Cardinals football seasons
Louisville Cardinals football